Sarah Kay is a professor of French at New York University.

Education
Kay was a student in the UK at the University of Oxford.

Career
She started her teaching career at the University of Liverpool then moved to the University of Cambridge. She was head of department at Cambridge from 1996 until 2001 and Director of Studies at Girton College, Cambridge, from 2003 to 2005. Kay has been a fellow of the British Academy since 2004 and was awarded a D.Litt. (Cambridge) in 2005.

Publications
 Parrots and Nightingales: Troubadour Quotations and the Development of European Poetry (Penn University Press, 2013)
 (with Adrian Armstrong) Knowing Poetry: Verse in Medieval France from the Rose to the Rhétoriqueurs'' (Cornell University Press, 2011)
 The Place of Thought: The Complexity of One in Late Medieval French Didactic Poetry (Penn University Press, 2007)
 Žižek: A Critical Introduction (Cambridge: Polity, 2003)
 (with Malcolm Bowie and Terence Cave) A Short History of French Literature (Oxford University Press, 2003)
 Courtly Contradictions (Stanford University Press, 2001)
 (with Simon Gaunt)  The Troubadours. An Introduction (Cambridge University Press, 1999)
 The Chansons de geste in the Age of Romance (Oxford University Press, 1995)
 (as co-editor with Miri Rubin) Framing Medieval Bodies (Manchester University Press, 1994)
 (as editor) Raoul de Cambrai (Oxford University Press, 1992)
 Subjectivity in Troubadour Poetry (Cambridge University Press, 1990)

References

External links
 Kay's profile at New York University
 Review of Kay's Courtly Contradictions published in The Medieval Review'', 2004.

Fellows of the British Academy
Literary critics of French
Living people
Alumni of the University of Oxford
Academics of the University of Cambridge
New York University faculty
Princeton University faculty
Year of birth missing (living people)
Academics of the University of Liverpool
Fellows of Girton College, Cambridge
British literary critics
British women literary critics